Açıkgüney is a village in the Kiğı District, Bingöl Province, Turkey. The village is populated by Kurds of the Giransor tribe and had a population of 92 in 2021.

The hamlets of Günaltay, Hoz Taşı and Samantepe are attached to the village.

References 

Villages in Kiğı District
Kurdish settlements in Bingöl Province